Gândul Mâței ("The cat's thought") is a Moldovan alternative rock band from Chișinău, formed in 1996.

Members 

Current members:
 Nicu Țărnă – vocal
 Sergiu Iarovoi – guitar
 Igor Cristov – keyboards
 Ghenadie Cazac – trumpet
 Sergiu Rusu – bass guitar

Former members:
 Bogdan Dascăl
 Dan Popov
 Valeriu Mazalu
 "Mamba"
 Iurie Berdea (died 2021)

Discography

Albums

Cu Gândul La Ea – 2000

La Ciocana – 2004

Ла Чокана - 2004

GheM în GheM – 2005

Комета - 2007

Generația în Blugi – 2014

EPs

În Profil (EP) – 2008

External links 
 
 Gândul Mâței at Myspace
 Gândul Mâței at last.fm

Moldovan rock music groups
Musical groups established in 1996
1996 establishments in Moldova